Sorokino is a rural locality (a selo) in Starooskolsky District, Belgorod Oblast, Russia. The population was 582 as of 2010. There are 18 streets.

Geography 
Sorokino is located 10 km south of Stary Oskol (the district's administrative centre) by road. Nizhneatamanskoye is the nearest rural locality.

References 

Rural localities in Starooskolsky District